Searching for Whitopia: An Improbable Journey to the Heart of White America is a 2009 non-fiction book by Rich Benjamin.

In May 2010, Benjamin briefly summarized his experiences in a TED talk.

Overview
African American journalist Rich Benjamin documents his journeys to find out why more and more white Americans move to small towns and areas that are, for the most part, white, and to explain why Whitopias are growing and what it means for the United States.

Benjamin mounted a two-year tour of the United States, covering 26,907 miles (43,303 km), looking for "Whitopias", which he defined as:
an area which has experienced at least 6% growth rate since 2000;
the great majority of that growth consists of white persons;
the area has a pleasant look, feel, ambiance, or charm.

He spent several months in three such areas: St. George, Utah, Coeur d'Alene, Idaho, and Forsyth County, Georgia. In each case, he generated a master plan to thoroughly immerse himself in the community's core, with lists of the power brokers, the important groups, and the significant events. He tried to volunteer or involve himself with those people and groups.

Author's experiences
In St. George, Benjamin rented a house over the telephone in a gated community, La Entrada.

He took up golfing, fishing and Texas hold 'em. He was generally welcomed in every instance, and learned that the dominant topic in St. George was illegal immigration; a local group had been organized to fight immigration, and they held regular rallies.

In Idaho, Benjamin rented a resort cabin at Lake Coeur d'Alene. He found a significant number of retired LAPD officers living there, and also found a significant number of gun owners where he learned to shoot a pistol at the local gun range.

He spent time at a retreat, the only non-white journalist in the group, at the Council of Aryan Nations compound. He was told that the group is not "white-supremacy"; they are "white-segregation" - they merely don't want to live in close proximity to non-white people. He noted the preponderance of Confederate flags.

In Georgia he found the predominant cultural activity revolved around a mega-church, so he involved himself in its activities. He felt the most comfortable in this situation, since both blacks and whites in this area are used to seeing the other - as contrasted to the first two sites, where a black person is still a rarity.

See also
White flight

References

External links
Searching for Whitopia at Google Books

2009 non-fiction books
Books about the United States
Books about race and ethnicity
Debut books
Books about cultural geography
English-language books
American non-fiction books
Works about White Americans
Race in the United States
Hyperion Books books
Demography books